All That I Am may refer to:

 All That I Am (Santana album), 2005
 All That I Am (Joe album), 1997
 All That I Am (Cynthia Johnson album), 2013
 All That I Am (Deborah Allen album), 1994
 "All That I Am" (Elvis Presley song), 1966
 "All That I Am" (Joe song), 1998
 "All That I Am", a song by Parachute from Losing Sleep
 All That I Am (novel), by Anna Funder